Lajami is a surname. Notable people with the surname include:

Ali Lajami (born 1996), Saudi Arabian footballer
Qassem Lajami (born 1996), Saudi Arabian footballer

See also
 Lajamina

Arabic-language surnames